People's Television Network (PTV) is a government television network owned by the Government of the Philippines and the main brand of People's Television Network, Inc. (PTNI), one of the attached agencies under the Presidential Communications Office (PCO). Headquartered in Broadcast Complex, Visayas Avenue, Diliman, Quezon City. The following is a list of all television programming that PTV is currently broadcasting since it began its television operations in 1974.

For the former programming of the network, see list of programs aired by People's Television Network.

Current local programming
Note: Titles are listed in alphabetical order followed by the year of debut in parentheses.

Newscasts
PTV Balita Ngayon 
PTV News Tonight 
PTV Sports 
Public Briefing: #LagingHandaPH 
Rise and Shine Pilipinas 
Sentro Balita 
Ulat Bayan 
Ulat Bayan Weekend

News specials
Malacañang Press Briefing 
Special Coverage

Public affairs
Iskoolmates 
Mike Abe Live 
Public Eye 
The Chatroom

Public service
The VAXplainer 
Tulay: Bridging People, Business and Government for Unity, Peace and Prosperity 
Yan ang Marino

Cultural
Lakbayin ang Magandang Pilipinas 
Sagisag Kultura TV (produced by National Commission for Culture and the Arts, 2017-2020, 2022)

Game shows
PCSO Lottery Draw

Infotainment
Auto Review 
Mag-Agri Tayo 
Saka-Inan

Religious shows
Jesus Miracle Crusade 
Oras ng Himala 
Word of God Network

Current acquired programming

Documentary (United States)
 Voice of America Documentaries

ASEAN
ASEAN Documentaries 
 ASEAN: Changing Lives
 ASEAN Now and The Future II: Discover New Buenavista
 ASEAN Women Entrepreneurship 
 Colours of ASEAN
 Faces of ASEAN 
 My City, My Love
 Proudly ASEAN
 Sharing ASEAN

Infotainment (Japan)

10 Minutes of Science 
A Look at Nature & Microworlds 
All About Rice 
Amazing Human Powers 
Data Box Science Search 
Gokui: Chasing the Dream 
Images of Japan 
Japan in Focus 
Japan Video Topics 
Make and Play 
Marco Polo: Ang Makabagong Paglalakbay 
Mathematica 2  
Maths Wonderland 
Numbers and Figures 
Only One Earth 
One, Two, Three Mathematics 
NHK Documentaries Puppet Theater Resilience Against Disaster Rise and Shine The Digital Cosmic Encyclopedia The Beauties of Nature Sacred Monuments of Asia Science of the Kitchen Science Sleuth The Adventures of "Mecha-Rappa" the Cosmic Rover The World of Mathematics Traditional Japanese Culture Traditional Japanese Sports Tokyo Know How Whiz Bang Science World of Wonders Wonderful Science 

Regional programming
NewscastsPTV News Ylocos Kangrunaan a Damag Ako Bicol News PTV News Mindanao PTV News Davao del Norte One DavNor Patrol PTV News Agusan del Sur PTV Agusan Newsbreak Maayong Buntag Agusan DavNor Weather Update 

Public affairsDavNor Sayron Ta! 
 Pulis DavNor Inyong Kauban Kamo Og Ang Inyong Kasundaluhan Pakigsayod Serbisyo Alang Sa Katawhang Pilipino Ang Panabo KaronDavNor Kaagapay Yes Sa Probinsya! CPDA: Aksyon Agad! KKK: Kasamtangang Katikaran Sa Kalambuan Isyu @ Serbisyo with Eddie Carta Kapihan sa DavNor USAPangkalusugan 

Talk, infotainment and lifestyleBe Unrivaled with Jianlin F. LakwaCha Madayaw Davao Mr. Covid-O: Tambahay nga Wais Barkada Hangout Game Na! 

Musical VarietyCordilleran Country: Aweng Ti Biag Chillout Tuesday with One Team Band Thursday's Afternoons Best with One Team/One Davnor Band 

EducationalDepEd TV: Eskwela, Tara Na!''

Previously aired programs

References

See also
 People's Television Network
 List of Philippine television shows

 
People's Television Network
People's Television Network